James Alistair Bain (14 December 1919 – 30 December 2002), was a Scottish footballer who played as a winger in the Football League.

References

External links

1919 births
2002 deaths
People from Blairgowrie and Rattray
Scottish footballers
Association football wingers
Chelsea F.C. players
Swindon Town F.C. players
Oxford United F.C. players
Gillingham F.C. players
English Football League players
British expatriates in Canada